Wayne Howell Chappelle (February 16, 1921 – July 8, 1993) was a voice-over announcer for the NBC television and radio networks from 1947 through 1986. He was born in Lexington, Kentucky, and became one member of a core group of New York-based announcers including Don Pardo, Bill Wendell, Jerry Damon, Arthur Gary, Vic Roby, Mel Brandt and Howard Reig who handled not only introducing and closing programs, but also teasers and promotions for the network's shows.

Howell's radio announcing credits included The Martin and Lewis Show, a 1950s version of The Chamber Music Society of Lower Basin Street, The NBC Radio Theatre, and Monitor. Among the television programs he announced on were Broadway Open House, Music Bingo, Dotto, Say When!!, Match Game, Concentration, Missing Links and Jackpot!.  From 1966 to 1985, he was announcer for the Miss America Pageant. Howell presumably provided voice-overs for numerous other NBC programs during his tenure, often as a substitute for the show's regular announcer. From 1980-1982 he introduced NBC's regional College Basketball opening. He would open with this...."NBC Sports in association with TVS presents the best college basketball. On the various conference game of the week."

Among his many assignments for NBC, Howell also appeared regularly as a personality on NBC's New York flagship radio station, WNBC (AM), from the 1940s through the mid-1960s.  He also was the last voice on WNWS, an all-news station that ran on NBC's FM owned-and-operated station in 1976, before the station switched to an adult contemporary format.
From 1974 through 1982 Howell was married to Donna Marie Gillin, a New York City socialite. They lived in midtown Manhattan until 1982. They were divorced in 1983. He is the maternal step-grandfather of stuntman, comedian and actor Steve-O.

Following his retirement from NBC, Howell moved to Broward County, Florida. He died in Pompano Beach, at age 72.

References

External links

 Wayne Howell radio credits

Game show announcers
American radio personalities
American television personalities
American male voice actors
1921 births
1993 deaths
Radio and television announcers
NBC network announcers
20th-century American male actors